Elections were held in Dufferin County, Ontario on October 24, 2022 in conjunction with municipal elections across the province.

Dufferin County Council
Dufferin County Council has 14 members, two from each constituent municipality except for East Garafraxa and East Luther Grand Valley which elect just one member.

Amaranth
The following were the results for mayor and deputy mayor of Amaranth.

Mayor
Deputy mayor Chris Gerrits ran against township councillor Heather Foster.

Deputy mayor

East Garafraxa

Mayor
Guy Gardhouse was re-elected as mayor of East Garafraxa by acclamation.

Grand Valley

Mayor
Steve Soloman was re-elected by acclamation as mayor of Grand Valley.

Melancthon
The following were the results for mayor and deputy mayor of Melancthon.

Mayor

Deputy mayor

Mono
The following were the results for mayor and deputy mayor of Mono.

Mayor
John Creelman was appointed as mayor in September 2021 after the previous mayor, Laura Ryan resigned. He was elected by acclamation.

Deputy mayor

Mulmur
The following were the results for mayor and deputy mayor of Mulmur.

Mayor

Deputy mayor

Orangeville
The following were the results for mayor and deputy mayor of Orangeville.

Mayor

Deputy mayor

Shelburne
The following were the results for mayor and deputy mayor of Shelburne.

Mayor
Incumbent mayor Wade Mills was re-elected by acclamation to serve a second term as mayor of Shelburne.

Deputy mayor

References

Dufferin
Dufferin County